The 1943 National Football League season resulted in a tie for the Eastern Division championship between the New York Giants and Washington Redskins, requiring a one-game playoff to be played between them. This division championship game was played on December 19, 1943, at the Polo Grounds. The winner of that game then traveled to Chicago to play in the championship game against the Chicago Bears on December 26.

Tournament bracket

Eastern Division championship

NFL Championship game

References

1943
Playoffs